Acutissimin A is a flavono-ellagitannin, a type of tannin formed from the linking of a flavonoid with an ellagitannin.

In 2003, scientists at Institut Européen de Chimie et Biologie in Pessac, France found that when the oak tannin vescalagin interacts with a flavanoid in wine acutissimin A is created. In separate studies this phenolic compound has been shown to be 250 times more effective than the pharmaceutical drug Etoposide in stopping the growth of cancerous tumors.

See also 
 Phenolic compounds in wine

References 

Flavono-ellagitannins
Antineoplastic drugs
Pyrogallols